Nong Saeng is a district (amphoe) of Saraburi province, central Thailand.

History
Originally, the district was created as a minor district (king amphoe) under Sao Hai district in 1938. It was upgraded to a full district in 1953.

The most people of Nong Saeng migrated from Vientiane. They established their new town near a pond surrounded by saeng trees, so they named their new town Ban Nong Saeng.

Geography
Neighboring districts are (from the north clockwise) Sao Hai, Mueang Saraburi, Nong Khae of Saraburi Province, and Phachi and Tha Ruea of Phra Nakhon Si Ayutthaya province.

Administration

Central administration 
The district Nong Saeng is subdivided into 9 subdistricts (Tambon), which are further subdivided into 69 administrative villages (Muban).

Local administration 
There is one subdistrict municipality (Thesaban Tambon) in the district:
 Nong Saeng consisting of the complete subdistrict Nong Saeng and parts of the subdistricts Nong Khwai So, Kai Sao.

There are 5 subdistrict administrative organizations (SAO) in the district:
 Nong Hua Pho consisting of the complete subdistrict Nong Hua Pho, Nong Sida.
 Nong Kop consisting of the complete subdistrict Nong Kop and parts of the subdistrict Nong Khwai So.
 Kai Sao consisting of parts of the subdistrict Kai Sao.
 Khok Sa-at consisting of the complete subdistrict Khok Sa-at.
 Muang Wan consisting of the complete subdistrict Muang Wan, Khao Din.

External links
amphoe.com

References

Nong Saeng